Typhoid vaccines are vaccines that prevent typhoid fever. Several types are widely available: typhoid conjugate vaccine (TCV), Ty21a (a live oral vaccine) and Vi capsular polysaccharide vaccine (ViPS) (an injectable subunit vaccine). They are about 30 to 70% effective in the first two years, depending on the specific vaccine in question. The Vi-rEPA vaccine has been shown to be efficacious in children.

The World Health Organization (WHO) recommends vaccinating all children in areas where the disease is common. Otherwise they recommend vaccinating those at high risk. Vaccination campaigns can also be used to control outbreaks of disease. Depending on the vaccine, additional doses are recommended every three to seven years. In the United States the vaccine is only recommended in those at high risk such as travelers to areas of the world where the disease is common.

The vaccines available as of 2018 are very safe. Minor side effects may occur at the site of injection. The injectable vaccine is safe in people with HIV/AIDS and the oral vaccine can be used as long as symptoms are not present. While it has not been studied during pregnancy, the non-live vaccines are believed to be safe while the live vaccine is not recommended.

The first typhoid vaccines were developed in 1896 by Almroth Edward Wright, Richard Pfeiffer, and Wilhelm Kolle. Due to side-effects newer formulations are recommended as of 2018. It is on the World Health Organization's List of Essential Medicines.

Medical uses
Ty21a, the Vi capsular polysaccharide vaccine, and Vi-rEPA are effective in reducing typhoid fever with low rates of adverse effects. Newer vaccines such as Vi-TT (PedaTyph) are awaiting field trials to demonstrate efficacy against natural exposure.

The oral Ty21a vaccine prevents around one-half of typhoid cases in the first three years after vaccination. The injectable Vi polysaccharide vaccine prevented about two-thirds of typhoid cases in the first year and had a cumulative efficacy of 55% by the third year. The efficacy of these vaccines has only been demonstrated in children older than two years.  Vi-rEPA vaccine, a new conjugate form of the injectable Vi vaccine, may be more effective and prevents the disease in many children under the age of five years. In a trial in 2-to-5-year-old children in Vietnam, the vaccine had more than 90 percent efficacy in the first year and protection lasted at least four years.

Schedule
Depending on the formulation it can be given starting at the age of two (ViPS), six (Ty21a), or six months (TCV).

Types
 Vi capsular polysaccharide vaccine: Typhim VI (Sanofi Pasteur); Typherix (GSK)
 Ty21a oral vaccine: Vivotif (Emergent BioSolutions)
 Typhoid conjugate vaccine: Typbar-TCV (Bharat Biotech)
 Combined hepatitis A and Vi polysaccharide vaccine: ViVaxim and ViATIM (Sanofi Pasteur); Hepatyrix (GSK)
 Activated whole cell vaccine remains available in some parts of the developing world .

References

External links
 

Typhoid fever
Live vaccines
Vaccines
World Health Organization essential medicines (vaccines)
Wikipedia medicine articles ready to translate